Shives (also Shrives) is an unincorporated community in Chicot County, Arkansas, United States.

U.S. Route 278 passes through Shives, and Shives is the first settlement west of the Greenville Bridge.

References

Unincorporated communities in Chicot County, Arkansas
Unincorporated communities in Arkansas